Johnnie Dixon (born December 11, 1988) is a former professional Canadian football/indoor American football defensive back who is currently a free agent. He signed as a free agent with the Toronto Argonauts on October 30, 2012. Dixon was a member of the 100th Grey Cup winning team. He also played college football for the Pearl River Community College Wildcats.

On May 29, 2013, Dixon retired from the CFL.

References

External links
 Saskatchewan Roughriders profile 
Toronto Argonauts profile

1988 births
Living people
African-American players of Canadian football
African-American players of American football
Alabama Hammers players
Canadian football defensive backs
Pearl River Wildcats football players
People from Belle Glade, Florida
Players of American football from Florida
Saskatchewan Roughriders players
Sportspeople from the Miami metropolitan area
Toronto Argonauts players
21st-century African-American sportspeople
20th-century African-American people